Uren River is a river of Costa Rica.

References

Rivers of Costa Rica